Nanaimo/Quennell Lake Water Aerodrome  is an aerodrome located on Quennell Lake,  southeast of Nanaimo, British Columbia, Canada.

See also
Nanaimo Airport
Nanaimo/Long Lake Water Airport
Nanaimo Harbour Water Aerodrome

References

Seaplane bases in British Columbia
Regional District of Nanaimo
Registered aerodromes in British Columbia